"E Tumi Kemon Tumi" is an Indian Bengali song from the Bengali film Jaatishwar (2014).  The lyrics of the song was written by Kabir Suman. The music was directed by Kabir Suman, and Rupankar Bagchi was the playback singer. The song fetched Rupankar Bagchi a national award (best male playback singer).

Release 
The song was released on 1 December 2013 and was popular among the audience.

Awards 
The song brought several national awards. Rupankar Bagchi won his first National Film Award for Best Male Playback Singer in 2013 for this song.

References

External links
 

Bengali-language songs
Indian songs
2014 songs